Latrodectus renivulvatus is a species of spider in the family Theridiidae, found in Africa, Saudi Arabia and Yemen. It is one of six species of Latrodectus found in southern Africa, four of which, including L. renivulvatus, are known as black button or black widow spiders. Like all Latrodectus species, L. renivulvatus has a neurotoxic venom. It acts on nerve endings, causing the very unpleasant symptoms of latrodectism when humans are bitten.

References

renivulvatus
Spiders of Africa
Spiders of Asia
Spiders described in 1902
Taxa named by Friedrich Dahl